Major-General Edward Joshua Cooper  (21 April 1858 – 8 March 1945) was a senior British Army officer.

Military career
Educated at Marlborough College and the Royal Military College, Sandhurst, Cooper was commissioned into the 99th (Lanarkshire) Regiment of Foot on 11 September 1876. He saw action during the Relief of Ladysmith in 1900 in the Second Boer War and the British expedition to Tibet in 1904. He went on to be commander of the troops in North China in 1910, commander of the 46th Brigade in around August 1915 and then commander of the 13th Brigade in December 1914 during the First World War. After that he became General Officer Commanding 58th (2/1st London) Division in 1915 before retiring in 1918.

References

1858 births
1945 deaths
British Army generals of World War I
British Army major generals
British Army personnel of the Second Boer War
Graduates of the Royal Military College, Sandhurst
Companions of the Order of the Bath
Companions of the Distinguished Service Order
Members of the Royal Victorian Order
People educated at Marlborough College